Sasha Polakow-Suransky (born April 3, 1979) is an American journalist and author. He is the deputy editor of Foreign Policy, and a former staff editor of International Op-Ed page at the New York Times and former senior editor of Foreign Affairs.

In 2015 he was an Open Society Fellow, while writing a book about the political impact of immigration. His first book, The Unspoken Alliance: Israel's Secret Relationship with Apartheid South Africa, was published in 2010. His second book, Go Back to Where You Came From: The Backlash Against Immigration and the Fate of Western Democracy.

Life
After graduating from Brown University, where he wrote for The College Hill Independent, Polakow-Suransky was awarded a Rhodes Scholarship and attended Oxford University, where he earned a doctorate in modern history.

He is the younger brother of Shael Polakow-Suransky; both are the children of Valerie Polakow and Leonard Suransky, South African Jews who were anti-apartheid activists in South Africa before emigrating to the United States in 1973 to avoid possible arrest.

Works
The Unspoken Alliance: Israel's Secret Relationship with Apartheid South Africa, Pantheon, 2010. , 
Go Back to Where You Came From: The Backlash Against Immigration and the Fate of Western Democracy, Nation Books, 2017. ,

References

1979 births
Living people
Brown University alumni
American Rhodes Scholars
The New York Times editors
American people of South African-Jewish descent
21st-century American journalists